Allophlebia is a genus of moth in the family Gelechiidae. It contains the species Allophlebia hemizancla, which is found in South Africa.

References

Endemic moths of South Africa
Gelechiinae
Monotypic moth genera
Moths of Africa